Defensin, alpha 3 (DEFA3) also known as human alpha defensin 3, human neutrophil peptide 3 (HNP-3) or neutrophil defensin 3 is a human protein that is encoded by the DEFA3 gene. Human alpha defensin 3 belongs to the alpha defensin family of antimicrobial peptides.

Function 

Defensins are a family of microbicidal and cytotoxic peptides thought to be involved in host defense. They are abundant in the granules of neutrophils and also found in the epithelia of mucosal surfaces such as those of the intestine, respiratory tract, urinary tract, and vagina. Members of the defensin family are highly similar in protein sequence and distinguished by a conserved cysteine motif. Several alpha defensin genes are clustered on chromosome 8.  The protein encoded by this gene, defensin, alpha 3, is found in the microbicidal granules of neutrophils and likely plays a role in phagocyte-mediated host defense. Several alpha defensin genes are clustered on chromosome 8. This peptide differs from defensin, alpha 1 by only one amino acid. This gene and the gene encoding defensin, alpha 1 are both subject to copy number variation.

References

Further reading

Defensins